In 1980–81 the Boston Celtics went 62-20 under coach Bill Fitch. Despite losing center Dave Cowens to retirement late in training camp, the Celtics went on to capture the 1981 NBA Championship over the Houston Rockets. The highlight was that this championship was achieved just two years after Larry Bird had been drafted.  Cedric Maxwell was named NBA Finals MVP.

Offseason

NBA draft
After the 1979-80 season, Auerbach completed what may be the most lopsided trade in NBA history.  Auerbach had always been a fan of stockpiling draft picks, so even after the success of 1979-80 the Celtics had both the 1st and 13th picks in the 1980 NBA draft left over from the M.L. Carr trade.  Auerbach saw an opportunity to improve the team immediately, sending the two picks to the Golden State Warriors in exchange for center Robert Parish and the Warriors first round pick, the 3rd overall, University of Minnesota power forward Kevin McHale.  With these three future Hall of Famers on the team the Celtics had a core in place to become a dominant team in the NBA.

Roster

Regular season

Season standings

Notes
 z, y – division champions
 x – clinched playoff spot

Record vs. opponents

Game log

Regular season

|-
|- align="center" bgcolor="#ccffcc"
| 1
| October 10
| Cleveland
| 130–103
|
|
|
| Boston Garden
| 1–0
|- align="center" bgcolor="#ffcccc"
| 2
| October 14
| @ Atlanta
| 116–122
|
|
|
| The Omni
| 1–1
|- align="center" bgcolor="#ccffcc"
| 3
| October 16
| @ Milwaukee
| 110–103
|
|
|
| MECCA Arena
| 2–1
|- align="center" bgcolor="#ffcccc"
| 4
| October 18
| @ Indiana
| 99–103
|
|
|
| Market Square Arena
| 2–2
|- align="center" bgcolor="#ccffcc
| 5
| October 22
| @ New Jersey
| 108–104
|
|
|
| Rutgers Athletic Center
| 3–2
|- align="center" bgcolor="#ffcccc"
| 6
| October 23
| New York
| 107–109 (OT)
|
|
|
| Hartford Civic Center
| 3–3
|- align="center" bgcolor="#ccffcc
| 7
| October 25
| @ Washington
| 103–87
|
|
|
| Capital Centre
| 4–3
|- align="center" bgcolor="#ccffcc"
| 8
| October 29
| @ Detroit
| 103–85
|
|
|
| Pontiac Silverdome
| 5–3
|- align="center" bgcolor="#ccffcc"
| 9
| October 31
| Kansas City
| 115–110
|
|
|
| Boston Garden
| 6–3
|-

|-
|- align="center" bgcolor="#ffcccc"
| 10
| November 1
| @ Philadelphia
| 113–117 (OT)
|
|
|
| The Spectrum
| 6–4
|- align="center" bgcolor="#ccffcc"
| 11
| November 5
| Atlanta
| 104–87
|
|
|
| Boston Garden
| 7–4
|- align="center" bgcolor="#ffcccc"
| 12
| November 7
| Milwaukee
| 101–102
|
|
|
| Boston Garden
| 7–5
|- align="center" bgcolor="#ccffcc"
| 13
| November 9
| Chicago
| 111–105
|
|
|
| Boston Garden
| 8–5
|- align="center" bgcolor="#ccffcc"
| 14
| November 12
| Washington
| 93–86
|
|
|
| Boston Garden
| 9–5
|- align="center" bgcolor="#ccffcc"
| 15
| November 14
| New Jersey
| 126–102
|
|
|
| Boston Garden
| 10–5
|- align="center" bgcolor="#ccffcc"
| 16
| November 18
| @ Chicago
| 113–107
|
|
|
| Chicago Stadium
| 11–5
|- align="center" bgcolor="#ccffcc"
| 17
| November 19
| @ Indiana
| 103–91
|
|
|
| Market Square Arena
| 12–5
|- align="center" bgcolor="#ccffcc"
| 18
| November 21
| Golden State
| 108–106
|
|
|
| Boston Garden
| 13–5
|- align="center" bgcolor="#ffcccc"
| 19
| November 22
| @ Cleveland
| 98–113
|
|
|
| Richfield Coliseum
| 13–6
|- align="center" bgcolor="#ccffcc"
| 20
| November 26
| Portland
| 126–101
|
|
|
| Boston Garden
| 14–6
|- align="center" bgcolor="#ccffcc"
| 21
| November 28
| New York
| 120–106
|
|
|
| Boston Garden
| 15–6
|- align="center" bgcolor="#ffcccc"
| 22
| November 30
| @ Milwaukee
| 105–107
|
|
|
| MECCA Arena
| 15–7
|-

|-
|- align="center" bgcolor="#ccffcc"
| 23
| December 2
| @ Detroit
| 94–85
|
|
|
| Pontiac Silverdome
| 16–7
|- align="center" bgcolor="#ccffcc"
| 24
| December 3
| Atlanta
| 106–101
|
|
|
| Boston Garden
| 17–7
|- align="center" bgcolor="#ccffcc"
| 25
| December 5
| Dallas
| 97–87
|
|
|
| Boston Garden
| 18–7
|- align="center" bgcolor="#ffcccc"
| 26
| December 7
| Washington
| 103–113
|
|
|
| Hartford Civic Center
| 18–8
|- align="center" bgcolor="#ccffcc"
| 27
| December 9
| Milwaukee
| 112–89
|
|
|
| Boston Garden
| 19–8
|- align="center" bgcolor="#ccffcc
| 28
| December 10
| @ Washington
| 101–99
|
|
|
| Capital Centre
| 20–8
|- align="center" bgcolor="#ccffcc"
| 29
| December 12
| New Jersey
| 119–104
|
|
|
| Boston Garden
| 21–8
|- align="center" bgcolor="#ccffcc"
| 30
| December 13
| @ Chicago
| 106–95
|
|
|
| Chicago Stadium
| 22–8
|- align="center" bgcolor="#ccffcc"
| 31
| December 17
| Chicago
| 115–98
|
|
|
| Boston Garden
| 23–8
|- align="center" bgcolor="#ccffcc"
| 32
| December 19
| Houston
| 133–119
|
|
|
| Boston Garden
| 24–8
|- align="center" bgcolor="#ccffcc"
| 33
| December 20
| @ Cleveland
| 107–102
|
|
|
| Richfield Coliseum
| 25–8
|- align="center" bgcolor="#ccffcc"
| 34
| December 23
| Denver
| 136–128
|
|
|
| Boston Garden
| 26–8
|- align="center" bgcolor="#ccffcc"
| 35
| December 25
| @ New York
| 117–108
|
|
|
| Madison Square Garden
| 27–8
|- align="center" bgcolor="#ccffcc"
| 36
| December 27
| @ Atlanta
| 112–107
|
|
|
| The Omni
| 28–8
|- align="center" bgcolor="#ccffcc"
| 37
| December 30
| @ Phoenix
| 116–97
|
|
|
| Arizona Veterans Memorial Coliseum
| 29–8
|-

|-
|- align="center" bgcolor="#ccffcc"
| 38
| January 1
| @ San Diego
| 88–85
|
|
|
| San Diego Sports Arena
| 30–8
|- align="center" bgcolor="#ffcccc"
| 39
| January 2
| @ Golden State
| 106–121
|
|
|
| Oakland-Alameda County Coliseum Arena
| 30–9
|- align="center" bgcolor="#ccffcc"
| 40
| January 4
| @ Portland
| 120–111
|
|
|
| Memorial Coliseum
| 31–9
|- align="center" bgcolor="#ccffcc"
| 41
| January 7
| Phoenix
| 108–90
|
|
|
| Boston Garden
| 32–9
|- align="center" bgcolor="#ccffcc"
| 42
| January 9
| Chicago
| 117–111 (OT)
|
|
|
| Boston Garden
| 33–9
|- align="center" bgcolor="#ccffcc
| 43
| January 10
| @ New Jersey
| 117–115
|
|
|
| Rutgers Athletic Center
| 34–9
|- align="center" bgcolor="#ccffcc"
| 44
| January 13
| @ New York
| 93–89
|
|
|
| Madison Square Garden
| 35–9
|- align="center" bgcolor="#ccffcc"
| 45
| January 14
| Cleveland
| 120–113
|
|
|
| Boston Garden
| 36–9
|- align="center" bgcolor="#ccffcc"
| 46
| January 16
| San Antonio
| 94–85
|
|
|
| Boston Garden
| 37–9
|- align="center" bgcolor="#ccffcc"
| 47
| January 18
| Los Angeles
| 98–96
|
|
|
| Boston Garden
| 38–9
|- align="center" bgcolor="#ccffcc"
| 48
| January 19
| Detroit
| 92–90
|
|
|
| Hartford Civic Center
| 39–9
|- align="center" bgcolor="#ccffcc"
| 49
| January 21
| Utah
| 117–87
|
|
|
| Boston Garden
| 40–9
|- align="center" bgcolor="#ccffcc"
| 50
| January 23
| Indiana
| 104–103
|
|
|
| Boston Garden
| 41–9
|- align="center" bgcolor="#ccffcc"
| 51
| January 25
| Seattle
| 115–106
|
|
|
| Boston Garden
| 42–9
|- align="center" bgcolor="#ccffcc"
| 52
| January 28
| Philadelphia
| 104–101
|
|
|
| Boston Garden
| 43–9
|- align="center" bgcolor="#ffcccc"
| 53
| January 29
| @ Chicago
| 85–108
|
|
|
| Chicago Stadium
| 43–10
|-

|-
|- align="center" bgcolor="#ffcccc"
| 54
| February 4
| @ Philadelphia
| 104–107
|
|
|
| The Spectrum
| 43–11
|- align="center" bgcolor="#ffcccc"
| 55
| February 5
| @ Milwaukee
| 103–113
|
|
|
| MECCA Arena
| 43–12
|- align="center" bgcolor="#ccffcc"
| 56
| February 6
| Indiana
| 111–98
|
|
|
| Boston Garden
| 44–12
|- align="center" bgcolor="#ccffcc"
| 57
| February 8
| San Diego
| 123–107
|
|
|
| Boston Garden
| 45–12
|- align="center" bgcolor="#ffcccc"
| 58
| February 10
| @ Seattle
| 107–108 (OT)
|
|
|
| Kingdome
| 45–13
|- align="center" bgcolor="#ccffcc"
| 59
| February 11
| @ Los Angeles
| 105–91
|
|
|
| The Forum
| 46–13
|- align="center" bgcolor="#ffcccc"
| 60
| February 13
| @ Utah
| 89–104
|
|
|
| Salt Palace
| 46–14
|- align="center" bgcolor="#ccffcc"
| 61
| February 15
| @ Denver
| 120–118
|
|
|
| McNichols Sports Arena
| 47–14
|- align="center" bgcolor="#ccffcc"
| 62
| February 17
| @ San Antonio
| 128–116
|
|
|
| HemisFair Arena
| 48–14
|- align="center" bgcolor="#ffcccc"
| 63
| February 18
| @ Kansas City
| 113–114
|
|
|
| Kemper Arena
| 48–15
|- align="center" bgcolor="#ccffcc"
| 64
| February 21
| @ Detroit
| 130–119
|
|
|
| Pontiac Silverdome
| 49–15
|- align="center" bgcolor="#ccffcc"
| 65
| February 25
| Cleveland
| 124–103
|
|
|
| Boston Garden
| 50–15
|- align="center" bgcolor="#ffcccc"
| 66
| February 27
| @ Atlanta
| 132–102
|
|
|
| The Omni
| 51–15
|-

|-
|- align="center" bgcolor="#ccffcc"
| 67
| March 1
| Philadelphia
| 114–107
|
|
|
| Boston Garden
| 52–15
|- align="center" bgcolor="#ccffcc"
| 68
| March 3
| @ Dallas
| 117–105
|
|
|
| Reunion Arena
| 53–15
|- align="center" bgcolor="#ccffcc"
| 69
| March 4
| @ Houston
| 108–101
|
|
|
| The Summit
| 54–15
|- align="center" bgcolor="#ffcccc"
| 70
| March 6
| @ Indiana
| 104–110
|
|
|
| Market Square Arena
| 54–16
|- align="center" bgcolor="#ccffcc"
| 71
| March 8
| New York
| 115–94
|
|
|
| Boston Garden
| 55–16
|- align="center" bgcolor="#ccffcc"
| 72
| March 11
| Milwaukee
| 122–108
|
|
|
| Boston Garden
| 56–16
|- align="center" bgcolor="#ffcccc"
| 73
| March 13
| Indiana
| 94–101
|
|
|
| Boston Garden
| 56–17
|- align="center" bgcolor="#ccffcc"
| 74
| March 15
| New Jersey
| 133–125
|
|
|
| Boston Garden
| 57–17
|- align="center" bgcolor="#ccffcc
| 75
| March 17
| @ Washington
| 112–91
|
|
|
| Capital Centre
| 58–17
|- align="center" bgcolor="#ffcccc"
| 76
| March 18
| Atlanta
| 97–108
|
|
|
| Boston Garden
| 58–18
|- align="center" bgcolor="#ccffcc"
| 77
| March 20
| Washington
| 128–116
|
|
|
| Boston Garden
| 59–18
|- align="center" bgcolor="#ffcccc"
| 78
| March 22
| @ Philadelphia
| 94–126
|
|
|
| The Spectrum
| 59–19
|- align="center" bgcolor="#ccffcc"
| 79
| March 24
| @ New York
| 118–116
|
|
|
| Madison Square Garden
| 60–19
|- align="center" bgcolor="#ccffcc
| 80
| March 25
| @ New Jersey
| 111–105
|
|
|
| Rutgers Athletic Center
| 61–19
|- align="center" bgcolor="#ffcccc"
| 81
| March 27
| Detroit
| 90–115
|
|
|
| Boston Garden
| 61–20
|- align="center" bgcolor="#ccffcc"
| 82
| March 29
| Philadelphia
| 98–94
|
|
|
| Boston Garden
| 62–20
|-

|-
| 1981 regular season schedule

Playoffs

|- align="center" bgcolor="#ccffcc"
| 1
| April 5
| Chicago
| W 121–109
| Larry Bird (23)
| Larry Bird (12)
| Bird, Maxwell (5)
| Boston Garden15,320
| 1–0
|- align="center" bgcolor="#ccffcc"
| 2
| April 7
| Chicago
| W 106–97
| Archibald, Parish (27)
| Larry Bird (12)
| Larry Bird (9)
| Boston Garden15,320
| 2–0
|- align="center" bgcolor="#ccffcc"
| 3
| April 10
| @ Chicago
| W 113–107
| Larry Bird (24)
| Larry Bird (17)
| Larry Bird (10)
| Chicago Stadium19,995
| 3–0
|- align="center" bgcolor="#ccffcc"
| 4
| April 12
| @ Chicago
| W 109–103
| Larry Bird (35)
| Larry Bird (11)
| Tiny Archibald (6)
| Chicago Stadium18,249
| 4–0
|-

|- align="center" bgcolor="#ffcccc"
| 1
| April 21
| Philadelphia
| L 104–105
| Larry Bird (33)
| Robert Parish (13)
| Tiny Archibald (9)
| Boston Garden15,320
| 0–1
|- align="center" bgcolor="#ccffcc"
| 2
| April 22
| Philadelphia
| W 118–99
| Larry Bird (34)
| Larry Bird (16)
| Larry Bird (5)
| Boston Garden15,320
| 1–1
|- align="center" bgcolor="#ffcccc"
| 3
| April 24
| @ Philadelphia
| L 100–110
| Larry Bird (22)
| Larry Bird (13)
| Tiny Archibald (5)
| Spectrum18,276
| 1–2
|- align="center" bgcolor="#ffcccc"
| 4
| April 26
| @ Philadelphia
| L 105–107
| Cedric Maxwell (20)
| Larry Bird (17)
| Tiny Archibald (14)
| Spectrum18,276
| 1–3
|- align="center" bgcolor="#ccffcc"
| 5
| April 29
| Philadelphia
| W 111–109
| Larry Bird (32)
| Larry Bird (11)
| Tiny Archibald (7)
| Boston Garden15,320
| 2–3
|- align="center" bgcolor="#ccffcc"
| 6
| May 1
| @ Philadelphia
| W 111–109
| Larry Bird (25)
| Larry Bird (16)
| Tiny Archibald (6)
| Spectrum18,276
| 3–3
|- align="center" bgcolor="#ccffcc"
| 7
| May 3
| Philadelphia
| W 91–90
| Larry Bird (23)
| Larry Bird (11)
| Tiny Archibald (7)
| Boston Garden15,320
| 4–3
|-

|- align="center" bgcolor="#ccffcc"
| 1
| May 5
| Houston
| W 98–95
| Larry Bird (18)
| Larry Bird (21)
| Larry Bird (9)
| Boston Garden15,320
| 1–0
|- align="center" bgcolor="#ffcccc"
| 2
| May 7
| Houston
| L 90–91
| Larry Bird (19)
| Larry Bird (21)
| Archibald, Henderson (4)
| Boston Garden15,320
| 1–1
|- align="center" bgcolor="#ccffcc"
| 3
| May 9
| @ Houston
| W 94–71
| Cedric Maxwell (19)
| Larry Bird (13)
| Larry Bird (10)
| The Summit16,121
| 2–1
|- align="center" bgcolor="#ffcccc"
| 4
| May 10
| @ Houston
| L 86–91
| Cedric Maxwell (24)
| Cedric Maxwell (14)
| Larry Bird (7)
| The Summit16,121
| 2–2
|- align="center" bgcolor="#ccffcc"
| 5
| May 12
| Houston
| W 109–80
| Cedric Maxwell (28)
| Cedric Maxwell (15)
| Larry Bird (8)
| Boston Garden15,320
| 3–2
|- align="center" bgcolor="#ccffcc"
| 6
| May 14
| @ Houston
| W 102–91
| Larry Bird (27)
| Larry Bird (13)
| Tiny Archibald (12)
| The Summit16,121
| 4–2
|-

Player stats
Note: GP= Games played; REB= Rebounds; AST= Assists; STL = Steals; BLK = Blocks; PTS = Points; AVG = Average

Award winners
 Nate Archibald, All-NBA Second Team
 Larry Bird, All-NBA First Team
 Cedric Maxwell, NBA Finals Most Valuable Player Award
 Kevin McHale, All-NBA Rookie Team

References

 Celtics on Database Basketball
 Celtics on Basketball Reference

Boston Celtics seasons
Eastern Conference (NBA) championship seasons
NBA championship seasons
Boston Celtics
Boston Celtics
Boston Celtics
Celtics
Celtics